Psorophora longipalpus is a species of mosquito in the family Culicidae.

References

Aedini
Articles created by Qbugbot
Insects described in 1944